Veselin Đuho (born 5 January 1960) is a Croatian professional water polo coach and former player who was a two-time Olympic gold medalist for Yugoslavia at the 1984 and 1988 Summer Olympics.

Đuho was born in Foča but moved to Dubrovnik as a child, where he started swimming in 1968, and joined VK Jug in 1974. He spent most of his career in Jug, winning with them five Yugoslav league titles, two Yugoslav cup titles, and the LEN Champions League in 1981.

Playing for the Yugoslavia national team, Đuho won the gold medal at the 1984 Olympics in Los Angeles and at the 1988 Olympics in Seoul, as well as the gold medal at the 1986 World Championship in Madrid, the gold medal at the 1987 World Cup, and silver medals at the 1985 European Championship in Sofia and the 1987 European Championship in Strasbourg. Later in his career he also played in Italy for Rari Nantes Salerno and Rari Nantes Cagliari, before retiring in 1993 to become Cagliari's coach.

He served as the head coach of Jug between 1997 and 2003, during which time the club won the 2000 LEN Cup, 2000–01 LEN Champions League, Croatian First League in 2000 and 2001, and Croatian Cup in 2001 and 2003. Đuho was then the head coach of VK Koper before become the head coach of Jug again in 2012. In March 2014, Đuho was relieved of his coaching duties in Jug, and was replaced by Miho Bobić.

See also
 Yugoslavia men's Olympic water polo team records and statistics
 List of Olympic champions in men's water polo
 List of Olympic medalists in water polo (men)
 List of world champions in men's water polo
 List of World Aquatics Championships medalists in water polo

References

External links
 

1960 births
Living people
Croatian male water polo players
Croatian water polo coaches
Yugoslav male water polo players
Olympiacos Water Polo Club coaches
Olympic water polo players of Yugoslavia
Olympic gold medalists for Yugoslavia
Water polo players at the 1984 Summer Olympics
Water polo players at the 1988 Summer Olympics
Sportspeople from Dubrovnik
Olympic medalists in water polo
Medalists at the 1988 Summer Olympics
Medalists at the 1984 Summer Olympics
Bosnia and Herzegovina emigrants to Croatia